Chilton is a city in and county seat of Calumet County in the U.S. state of Wisconsin. The population was 4,080 at the 2020 census. The city is located partially within the Town of Chilton.

History
The first residents of Chilton were African-American former slave Moses Stanton and his Native-American wife, Catherine, who arrived in January 1845. The city formed around his saw mill and a grist mill a few years later.

The village was originally called Stantonville. John Marygold bought the place in 1852 and called it "Chilington," referring to Chillington Hall in England. He sent a verbal message to have the name change recorded in Stockbridge, then the county seat. Because the middle ing in the name was accidentally omitted, the municipality was recorded as Chilton. An alternative explanation for the name is that it was a reference to a village called Chilton near Oxford, England.

The county seat was changed to Chilton in December 1853 and the county's first courthouse was built. Most Chilton residents in the 19th century had German heritage.

Gravesville
Chilton annexed the unincorporated community of Gravesville in the late twentieth century. Gravesville was founded 1849 by Leroy Graves and the community was named after him. By 1881 it was one of the largest communities in the county behind Chilton and Stockbridge. Gravesville had over 400 residents and it unsuccessfully vied for becoming the county seat. Graves built a sawmill in 1849 which remained in the community until he moved it to Fond du Lac in 1886. At its peak, the community had several general stores, a furniture factory, and a saw/planing mill. It also had a post office (as of 1876).

Geography
Chilton is located at  (44.030745, -88.158704), along the South Branch of the Manitowoc River.

Demographics

2020 census
As of the census of 2020, there were 4,080 people.

2010 census
As of the census of 2010, there were 3,933 people, 1,687 households, and 1,027 families residing in the city. The racial makeup of the city was 95.8% White, 0.2% African American, 0.4% Native American, 0.5% Asian, 0.2% Pacific Islander, 2.0% from other races, and 0.9% from two or more races. Hispanic or Latino of any race were 4.3% of the population.

There were 1,687 households, out of which 27.7% had children under the age of 18 living with them, 48.0% were married couples living together, 8.2% had a female householder with no husband present, 4.7% had a male householder with no wife present, and 39.1% were non-families. 34.7% of all households were made up of individuals, and 16.7% had someone living alone who was 65 years of age or older. The average household size was 2.28 and the average family size was 2.93.

The median age in the city was 40 years. 24% of residents were under the age of 18; 6.3% were between the ages of 18 and 24; 26.3% were from 25 to 44; 25.9% were from 45 to 64; and 17.5% were 65 years of age or older. The gender makeup of the city was 48.3% male and 51.7% female.

2000 census
As of the census of 2000, there were 3,708 people, 1,512 households, and 952 families residing in the city. The racial makeup of the city was 98.49% White, 0.38% Black or African American, 0.32% Native American, 0.24% Asian, 0.19% from other races, and 0.38% from two or more races. 0.86% of the population were Hispanic or Latino of any race.

There were 1,512 households, out of which 30.3% had children under the age of 18 living with them, 51.6% were married couples living together, 8.5% had a female householder with no husband present, and 37.0% were non-families. 31.7% of all households were made up of individuals, and 14.4% had someone living alone who was 65 years of age or older. The average household size was 2.35 and the average family size was 2.99.

In the city the population was spread out, with 24.2% under the age of 18, 8.7% from 18 to 24, 29.8% from 25 to 44, 19.0% from 45 to 64, and 18.3% who were 65 years of age or older. The median age was 37 years. For every 100 females there were 98.6 males. For every 100 females age 18 and over, there were 94.1 males.

The median income for a household in the city was $38,401, and the median income for a family was $51,581. Males had a median income of $35,163 versus $22,672 for females. The per capita income for the city was $19,778. About 4.9% of families and 7.4% of the population were below the poverty line, including 13.1% of those under age 18 and 7.2% of those age 65 or over.

Transportation

Highway
Primary routes to the city are Wisconsin Highway 57/Wisconsin Highway 32 to the north and southeast, and U.S. Route 151 to the east and west. Secondary routes are County Highway G to the south, County Highway F to the northwest, and County Highway Y to the northeast.

Water
The south branch of the Manitowoc River snakes through Chilton. Some of the river is navigable, but it is unused except for recreational canoeing. A widening of the river called Lake Chilton has been used for ice skating in winter.

Education
Chilton's public schools are administered by the Chilton Public Schools. The district has one high school, Chilton High School, one elementary school, Chilton Elementary School, and one middle school, Chilton Middle School.

Chilton Area Catholic School is a private Roman Catholic grade school in the city.

Healthcare
Ascension Calumet Hospital is a 25 bed critical access hospital. There are 5.3 primary care physicians per 100,000 population in Chilton compared to the statewide average of 75.6. Chilton is located in a primary care Health Professional Shortage Area (HPSA) qualifying the area as a medical desert. By 2035, Chilton is expected to have a 79.2% deficit in physicians, the third largest predicted deficit in Wisconsin. There are no behavior health physicians in Chilton.

Notable people

 George Baldwin, Mayor of Chilton, politician, businessman
 Thomas P.M. Barnett, military geostrategist
 Winifred Bonfils, early 20th Century journalist
 Dave Casper, an NFL Pro Football Hall of Fame player; graduated from Chilton High School in 1970
 Gerald Francis Clifford, a Green Bay Packers executive, Democratic politician and lawyer
 Lewis H. Cook, Wisconsin State Representative
 Jerome F. Fox, Wisconsin State Representative
 Harrison Carroll Hobart, Union Army general, Hobart Park named after him
 Frank L. Kersten, Wisconsin State Representative
 Julius Kiesner, Socialist State Representative
 Francis Peter Leipzig, Roman Catholic bishop
 Nicholas J. Lesselyoung, Wisconsin State Representative
 Thomas Lynch, U.S. Representative
 John McMullen, Wisconsin State Senator
 Robert W. Monk, Wisconsin State Senator, physician, and Mayor of Chilton
 Carl J. Peik, Wisconsin State Representative
 Henry Rollman, Wisconsin State Senator
 Reinhard Schlichting, Wisconsin State Senator
 Benjamin Sweet, Wisconsin State Senator and Union Army general
 Herman C. Wipperman, Wisconsin State Senator

Notable businesses
Kaytee, a bird seed producer is headquartered in Chilton. 
Gravity Park USA, a motocross track, is located near Chilton.

Radio stations
 WKZY, 92.9 FM - Top 40/CHR; is licensed to Chilton
 WMBE (now WVXN), 1530 AM - currently silent; formerly had studios in Chilton as a polka station.

References

External links

 City of Chilton
 Chilton Chamber of Commerce
 Sanborn fire insurance maps: 1892 1898 1904 1914

Cities in Wisconsin
Cities in Calumet County, Wisconsin
County seats in Wisconsin
Populated places established in 1845
1845 establishments in Wisconsin Territory
Populated places established by African Americans